The ISPRS Journal of Photogrammetry and Remote Sensing is the official journal of International Society for Photogrammetry and Remote Sensing (ISPRS), publishes scientific and technical articles and reviews in photogrammetry, remote sensing, and related fields. It is published by Elsevier and is edited by Clément Mallet (French National Institute of Geographic and Forestry Information, IGN) and Qihao Weng (Department of Land Surveying and Geo-Informatics, Hong Kong Polytechnic University). The journal was originally established as Internationales Archiv für Photogrammetrie in 1908, changing its name to Photogrammetria in 1938, and taking its current name in 1989.

Abstracting and indexing 
The journal is abstracted and indexed in the following bibliographic databases:

According to the Journal Citation Reports, the journal has a 2021 impact factor of 11.774, ranking it 1st out of 50 journals in the category Geography, Physical.

References

External links
 
Photogrammetry journals
Remote sensing journals
Monthly journals
Elsevier academic journals
Academic journals associated with international learned and professional societies
Publications established in 1908